Ctenopelmatinae is a cosmopolitan subfamily of ichneumonid parasitoid wasps.

Description and distribution 
Ctenopelmatines are small to medium sized ichneumonids. They have a small tooth at the apex of the front tibia and usually do not have a fringe of setae along the clypeus. Ctenopelmatinae was included in the subfamily Tryphoninae in the past. Evidence from larval morphology and ecological traits separate these two groups, but adult specimens can be difficult to differentiate.

Most species are found in temperate climates in the Holarctic region. In the cooler parts of their range, ctenopelmatines can account for over 10% of all ichneumonids.

Biology 
Ctenopelmatinae are koinobiont endoparasitoids of Symphyta and, more rarely, Lepidoptera. The host is not killed until after it has spun a cocoon to pupate. There are 95 genera.

References

External links 
 
 Photos at Bugguide.net
 Diagnostic characters
 Waspweb

 
Apocrita subfamilies
Taxa named by Arnold Förster